Oscar Peterson Plays the Jerome Kern Songbook is a 1959 album by Oscar Peterson, of compositions by Jerome Kern.

Track listing
 "I Won't Dance" (Dorothy Fields, Oscar Hammerstein II, Otto Harbach, Jimmy McHugh) – 2:32
 "Bill" (Hammerstein) – 2:58
 "The Song Is You"	 (Hammerstein) – 3:04
 "A Fine Romance"	(Fields) – 3:09
 "Can't Help Lovin' Dat Man" (Hammerstein) – 2:45
 "Ol' Man River" (Hammerstein) – 2:38
 "Long Ago (and Far Away)" (Ira Gershwin) – 2:35
 "Lovely to Look At" (Fields, McHugh) – 2:48
 "Pick Yourself Up" (Fields) – 2:12
 "Smoke Gets in Your Eyes" (Harbach) – 2:49
 "The Way You Look Tonight" (Fields) – 3:41
 "Yesterdays" (Harbach) – 3:17

All music written by Jerome Kern, lyricists indicated.

Personnel

Performance
Ray Brown - double bass
Oscar Peterson - piano
Ed Thigpen - drums

References

1959 albums
Oscar Peterson albums
Albums produced by Norman Granz
Verve Records albums
Jerome Kern tribute albums